The Spain Olympic football team (also known as Spain Under-23, or Spain U-23) represents Spain in international football competitions in the Olympic Games. The selection is limited to players under the age of 23, except for the Olympics which allows the men's team up to three overage players. The team is controlled by the Royal Spanish Football Federation. Having qualified for five Olympic competitions since 1992, Spain has won one gold medal (1992) and two silver medals (2000 and 2020). It is one of the most successful Olympic teams

History

1920–1988 Summer Olympics
Unlike later tournaments, the Summer Olympics used to be represented by senior or amateur teams. Spain's first participation in the Olympics was in Antwerp, Belgium, in 1920. Fourteen teams entered the competition which was organized on a knockout basis. Twelve teams entered the first round, with the six winners joining the host nation (Belgium) and France, in the quarter-finals. Czechoslovakia, participating in their first international tournament, cruised to the final, inflicting heavy defeats on Yugoslavia (who played their first ever international match in the competition), Norway, and France. Belgium beat a talented Spain and then the Netherlands on their way to the final. Belgium won the gold medal by default after Czechoslovakia walked off in protest during the final, unhappy with the performance of the English referee, John Lewis. The Bergvall System was used to determine second and third places. The beaten quarter-finalists played-off, Spain emerged triumphant overcoming Sweden 2–1 and Italy 2–0. Ordinarily, Spain would then have played the beaten finalists, but Czechoslovakia had been disqualified from the tournament. Spain thus advanced straight to the silver medal match against Holland, beaten in the semi-finals by gold medallists Belgium. Spain won 3–1.

1924 was not as successful, Spain bowed out of competition in the first round after losing to Italy 1–0.

At the 1928 Summer Olympics things would go from good to worse. Spain were, potentially, much to be feared. Defeated once since the last Olympic Games tournament their traditional tournament nerves would handicap them here, a key note that would strike throughout the coming years. The unavoidable loss of their experienced captain Pedro Vallana after their first game, though, would cost them dearly. Spain started with a 7–1 win over Mexico, then a 1–1 draw against Italy which would cause the match to go on a reply. There Spain were eventually eliminating with a 1–7 defeat.

Spain would not compete in another Olympic tournament until the 1968 edition held in Mexico. There the team fielded an under-21 amateur squad and reached the quarter-finals, losing only to the host nation. Meanwhile, communist nations entered their top professional teams using a loophole in the rules.

The team's final two tournaments came in 1976 and 1980, where they failed to make it out of the group stage, being powerless against first teams of the Eastern Bloc.

Debut and Gold at the 1992 Summer Olympics
The football competition at the 1992 Summer Olympics was the first under-23 competition. Spain were awarded a place at the tournament because they were the host nation. Expectations were high for the Spanish team and they did not disappoint: The team was able to win their first gold medal after winning their group stage, defeating long-time rivals Italy in the quarter-finals and lastly Poland in the finals, 3–2.

1996 Summer Olympics
Spain were able to qualify for the following Olympics, managed by then coach Javier Clemente. La Rojita failed to repeat their past success and were eliminated in the quarter-finals by eventual runners-up Argentina.

Silver at the 2000 Summer Olympics – Sydney 
Spain qualified for their third consecutive tournament in 2000. The squad, managed by head coach Iñaki Sáez, reached their second final but were not able to take gold, losing to Cameroon. Spain had a 2–0 lead at half time but things changed in the second half when an own goal from Iván Amaya (who also missed a penalty), and a goal from Samuel Eto'o five minutes later, levelled the scores at 2–2. The score was unchanged after extra time and the match was decided via penalty shootout, with Spain losing 5–3.

2012 Summer Olympics
After eight years without participation, Spain qualified for the 2012 Summer Olympics after winning the 2011 UEFA European Under-21 Championship under head coach Luis Milla. They were scheduled to play against Japan, Morocco and Honduras in the group stage. Before the start of the tournament, Spain scheduled three friendly matches against teams that would be competing at the Olympics: The first was a 3–1 victory over Egypt, followed by a 2–0 defeat against Senegal and a 1–0 victory over Mexico five days later. At the Olympics, Spain was eliminated in the group stage after falling shockingly 1–0 to Japan and a controversial loss to Honduras. This was followed by a 0–0 draw to Morocco, forcing Spain's exit from the tournament at the group stage for the first time, and without scoring a single goal. Luis Milla was sacked from both the under-23 and under-21 teams the following day and replaced by Julen Lopetegui.

Silver at the 2020 Summer Olympics – Tokyo
Spain qualified to the 2020 Olympics after winning the 2019 UEFA European Under-21 Championship. Six Spanish players: Unai Simón, Pau Torres, Eric García, Pedri, Mikel Oyarzabal and Dani Olmo who had participated in the UEFA Euro 2020 played a major role for Spain in the 2020 Olympics under coach Luis de la Fuente. La Rojita reached the final, but they lost 2–1 against Brazil after extra time.

Results and fixtures

The following is a list of match results in the last 12 months, as well as any future matches that have been scheduled.

Legend

2021

Records

Most capped players

Note: Club(s) represents the permanent clubs during the player's time in the Under-23s.

Top goalscorers

Note: Club(s) represents the permanent clubs during the player's time in the Under-23s.

 Caps and goals correct as of 7 August 2021.

Players

Current squad 
The following players were named to the squad for the 2020 Summer Olympics.

Players who were also called up for Euro 2020 are marked with asterisk (*).

Overage players in Olympic Games

Honours
Summer Olympics
 Gold medalists (1): 1992
 Silver medalists (3): 1920, 2000, 2020

Competitive record

Summer Olympics

*Denotes draws including knockout matches decided via penalty shoot-out.
**Since 1968, Spain has sent its under-23 national team.

UEFA European Under-23 Challenge Cup
This was competed for on a basis similar to a boxing title belt.  The holders played a randomly chosen opponent for the championship.

UEFA European Under-23 Championship

Mediterranean Games

See also
Spain national football team
Spain national under-21 football team
Spain national under-20 football team
Spain national under-19 football team
Spain national under-18 football team
Spain national under-17 football team
Spain national under-16 football team
Spain national under-15 football team
Spain national youth football team

Notes

References

External links
 
siemprecantera 
Tournament archive at uefa.com
UEFA U-23 European Championship at rsssf

European national under-23 association football teams
 
Football